Jordi Fernández Torres (born December 27, 1982) is a Spanish basketball coach, currently the associate head coach for the Sacramento Kings of the National Basketball Association (NBA) and assistant coach for the Nigeria national team.

Coaching career
Fernández began his National Basketball Association (NBA) coaching career in 2009 when he was hired by the Cleveland Cavaliers as a player development coach. In 2013, Fernández took an opportunity to join the Canton Charge in the NBA Development League as the top assistant coach. One year later he became the head coach.

In 2009, Mike Brown, former head coach of the Cleveland Cavaliers, hired Fernández to be a player development coach with the team. There, he tutored Kyrie Irving, Tristan Thompson, Dion Waiters, Matthew Dellavedova and other players. Mike Gansey, the Cavaliers Assistant General Manager, spoke highly of Fernández during his tenure with the Cavaliers: "Whoever walks through that door, [Fernández] can relate to them... he's either watched it, lived it or seen it. That's why he's so valuable." Fernández also worked with LeBron James and Shaquille O'Neal during his time with the Cavaliers. He was also on the coaching staff during the Cavaliers' 2016 NBA Championship.

To start the 2016–17 season, the Denver Nuggets added Fernández to their coaching staff as an assistant coach.

Fernández was referenced in ESPN’s annual report on potential coaching candidates to watch in April 2018. Players on the Nuggets’ roster spoke highly of Fernández. Monté Morris said, "He's an all about business guy."

On May 18, 2022, Fernández was hired as the associate head coach of the Sacramento Kings. After being hired as associate head coach, Fernández served as the head coach of the Kings' Summer League team in 2022. He helped the 4th overall pick in the 2022 draft, Keegan Murray, win the 2022 Summer League MVP award. On December 14, 2022, Fernández took over as acting head coach after the Kings' head coach, Mike Brown, was ejected mid-game. He assumed the same role for back to back games against the Denver Nuggets on December 27, 2022, and December 28, 2022, with Brown entering health and safety protocols. Before playing the Nuggets on December 27, 2022, Nuggets head coach, Michael Malone, who Fernández worked under in his previous coaching stop said, "I think one day Jordi will be a head coach in this league. He’s been a head coach in the G League. He’s got great international experience. This team is on the right path with the right coaches, so I’m really happy for them.”

National team career 
Fernandez was an assistant coach for the Nigeria national team under Mike Brown at the 2020 Summer Olympics in Tokyo, Japan.

Education
Fernandez's background in academia provides him with a unique perspective on coaching. His college degree is in sports sciences, and is one completed academic article away from his PhD in sports psychology. He has extensively studied and researched the observation of human behavior. In 2009, Fernandez co-authored an academic article titled Identifying and analyzing the construction and effectiveness of offensive plays in basketball by using systematic observation.

Head coaching record

NBA D-League

|-
| align="left" |Canton
| align="left" |2014–15
|50||31||19|||| align="center" |2nd in East||5||2||3||
| align="center" |Lost Semifinals
|-
| align="left" |Canton
| align="left" |2015–16
|50||31||19|||| align="center" |2nd in Central||4||2||2||
| align="center" |Lost Semifinals
|-
|-class="sortbottom"
| align="left" |Career
| ||100||62||38|||| ||9||4||5||

See also
 List of foreign NBA coaches

References

1982 births
Living people
Canton Charge coaches
Catalan basketball coaches
Cleveland Cavaliers assistant coaches
Denver Nuggets assistant coaches
People from Badalona
Sportspeople from the Province of Barcelona
Sacramento Kings assistant coaches
Sportspeople from Barcelona
University of Barcelona alumni
Spanish expatriate basketball people in the United States